("The Labyrinth or The Struggle with the Elements. The Magic Flute's Second Part") is a "grand heroic-comic opera" in two acts composed in 1798 by Peter von Winter to a German libretto by Emanuel Schikaneder. The work is in the form of a Singspiel, a popular form that included both singing and spoken dialogue. The opera is a sequel of Mozart's The Magic Flute.

Performance history
The opera premiered at the suburban Freihaus-Theater auf der Wieden in Vienna on 12 June 1798. Schikaneder himself played Papageno, while the role of the Queen of the Night was sung by Mozart's sister-in-law Josepha Hofer-Mayer. Schikaneder was the librettist of Mozart's opera and he was considered to have been "one of the most original and most influential theatre persons of his time". Both artists were reprising their roles from The Magic Flute.

Alexandra Liedtke, the director of the Salzburg Festival production in 2012, interpreted the story and Schikaneder's libretto "as one [of] the great fairy tales of history [...], in which the emblematic and the playfulness are standing in the limelights".

The opera was then also performed at the Theater an der Wien and the Konzerthaus Berlin (1803), the Opern- und Schauspielhaus Frankfurt (1806), the Staatstheater Nürnberg (1807) and other venues. In 1978, there was a production without spoken dialogue in an unauthentic musical arrangement, conducted by Wolfgang Sawallisch, directed by August Everding, stage design by Jürgen Rose in the Cuvilliés Theatre, Munich, and in September 2002 it was performed at Chemnitz Opera.

In August 2012, the opera was presented for the first time at the Salzburg Festival, in the courtyard of the residence of the Prince Archbishop of Salzburg, conducted by Ivor Bolton and directed by Alexandra Liedtke.

In October 2013, the opera was performed in USA for the first time, by New York City's Amore Opera, the small opera company which emerged after Amato Opera closed.

Roles

Synopsis

After fighting against fire and water there are still two elements for Pamina and Tamino which are not defeated: the air and the earth. Tipheus tries to divorce the engaged couple and Monostatos tries to force the love of Papagena. Papageno is meeting his parents and siblings.

Goethe's sequel
There is another sequel to the original Magic Flute, also named , a libretto fragment by Johann Wolfgang von Goethe, intended to be set to music by Paul Wranitzky.

References

 Branscombe, Peter (1991) , Cambridge Opera Handbooks series, Cambridge University Press.
 Brukner, Fritz (1934, ed.) . Verlag Gilhofer & Ranschburg, Vienna.
 Buch, David (2004) ", Masonic Opera, and Other Fairy Tales", in Acta Musicologica 76, 2004.
 Henderson, Donald G. (1983) "The "Magic Flute of Peter Winter", in Music & Letters 64 (3–4), pp. 193–205.
 Jahrmärker, Manuela and Waidelich, Till Gerrit (1992, ed.) . Hans Schneider, Tutzing.

Further reading
 Waidelich, Till Gerrit (2012) "", in: Acta Mozartiana, 59 (2012), pp. 139–177.

External links 
 Variations for Pianoforte by Joseph Wölfl, Bavarian State Library, Munich.
 

Compositions by Peter Winter
German-language operas
Works based on The Magic Flute
Singspiele
Operas
1798 operas
Operas set in fictional, mythological and folkloric settings